The 1973 Trans-Am Series was the eighth running of the Sports Car Club of America's premier series. It began on April 15 and ran for six rounds. Due to the decline of demand for muscle cars in the early seventies and the energy crisis that year, 1973 is considered to be the beginning of the decline of Trans Am. In contrast to American muscle dominating previous years, Porsche won the manufacturers' championship this year. 1973 also saw the rise of silhouette cars as a way of adapting to the decline of performance cars, ultimately making the cars interchangeable with IMSA GTO and GTU.

Results

Championships

Driver
Peter Gregg – 56 points
Al Holbert – 49 points
J. Marshall Robbins – 42 points
Warren Agor – 39 points
Jerry Thompson – 34 points

Manufacturer
Porsche – 31 points
Camaro – 28 points
Chevrolet Corvette – 23 points
Ford Escort – 3 points

References

Trans-Am Series
Trans-Am